Shooting the Mafia is a documentary film directed by Kim Longinotto about Italian photographer Letizia Battaglia and her career documenting the life and crimes of the Mafia in and around Palermo. Battaglia offers a glimpse into life under Mafia rule and those who live through it.

It won the Audience Award at the 2019 Brussels International Film Festival (BRIFF).

References

External links
 
 
 
 

2019 documentary films
2019 films
Documentary films about organized crime
Films about the Sicilian Mafia
Cultural depictions of Italian women